Veeder is a surname. Notable people with the surname include:

Charles H. Veeder (1796–1871), American lawyer and businessman
Emily Elizabeth Veeder (1841–?), American author
Korey Veeder (born 1991), American soccer player
Paul Veeder, American football player
Van Vechten Veeder (1867–1942), American judge
William D. Veeder (1835–1910), American politician
William Veeder (born 1940), American literary critic

See also
Mount Veeder AVA, American Viticultural Area
3510 Veeder, main-belt asteroid